A flamethrower is a weapon that projects long streaks of flames. 
 See List of flamethrowers

It can also refer to:
Flame tank, a tank that does the same effect as a flamethrower
Flamethrower radio station, another name for a clear-channel radio station
"Flamethrower" (song), a song by J. Geils Band on their album Freeze Frame
Flamethrower (album), 2000 album by Chicago Underground Trio
A model of brightly colored salmon fly, from its appearance
Flamethrower, a Pokémon attack

See also
Flamethrower palm, a name for the plant Chambeyronia macrocarpa.
Greek fire, a Byzantine weapon
The Flamethrowers, a 2013 novel by Rachel Kushner